In spectroscopy, oscillator strength is a dimensionless quantity that expresses the probability of absorption or emission of electromagnetic radiation in transitions between energy levels of an atom or molecule. For example, if an emissive state has a small oscillator strength, nonradiative decay will outpace radiative decay. Conversely, "bright" transitions will have large oscillator strengths. The oscillator strength can be thought of as the ratio between the quantum mechanical transition rate and the classical absorption/emission rate of a single electron oscillator with the same frequency as the transition.

Theory 
An atom or a molecule can absorb light and undergo a transition from
one quantum state to another.

The oscillator strength  of a transition from a lower state
 to an upper state  may be defined by

the reduced Planck constant. The quantum states  1,2, are assumed to have several
"Degenerate" means
that they all have the same energy .
The operator  is the sum of the x-coordinates 
of all  electrons in the system, etc.:

The oscillator strength is the same for each sub-state .

The definition can be recast by inserting the Rydberg energy  and Bohr radius 

Thomas–Reiche–Kuhn sum rule 

To make equations of the previous section applicable to the states belonging to the continuum spectrum, they should be rewritten in terms of matrix elements of the momentum .
.

Because , the above expression results in a sum rule

This is the Thomas-Reiche-Kuhn sum rule, and the term with  has been omitted because in confined systems such as atoms or molecules the diagonal matrix element  due to the time inversion symmetry of the Hamiltonian . Excluding this term eliminates divergency because of the vanishing denominator.

Sum rule and electron effective mass in crystals 

In crystals, the electronic energy spectrum has a band structure . It can be shown that it satisfies the equation

Therefore, the ratio  of the free electron mass  to its effective mass  in a crystal can be considered as the oscillator strength for the transition of an electron from the quantum state at the bottom of the  band into the same state.

See also 
 Atomic spectral line
 Sum rule in quantum mechanics
 Electronic band structure
Einstein coefficients

References 

Spectroscopy
Atoms
Crystals